The  took place between monks of the Nichiren and Jōdo sects of Japanese Buddhism, at Oda Nobunaga's Azuchi Castle in 1579.

The incident was caused by a number of disturbances caused by Nichiren followers intolerant of Jōdo thought or practices. This came about in the early June 1579 after the arrival of the Jōdo priest Gyokunen Reiyo in Azuchi. When he was accosted by two Nichiren laymen, Reiyo challenged the priests who he said converted the hecklers, citing that they were mere novices. This was accepted by Nichiren masters, who sent a large delegation of priests from Kyoto. Nobunaga, who effectively ruled over all of Japan at the time, first forbade the debate. He had a long history of low tolerance for the hypocrisy of violence or competition for power among religious groups. In addition, some scholars claimed that he feared the incident could cause a large-scale uprising in the Kinai. The Nichiren priests ignored his order so Nobunaga consented to the discussion.

In the end, he ordered the Nichiren supporters responsible for the disturbances to be executed, including the previously independent monk and proselytizer Fuden Nichimon, on the grounds of his simony into the Nichiren side of the debate and his duplicit inaction within it, as well as his unauthorized entry to Azuchi. Fearful of a more widespread persecution, the Nichiren establishment apologized for its transgressions and promised to be more tolerant in the future, but a large indemnity was still imposed upon it. The outcome established an enforced religious tolerance in Japan.

References

Frederic, Louis (2002). "Azuchi shūron." Japan Encyclopedia. Cambridge, Massachusetts: Harvard University Press.

1579 in Japan
Buddhist controversies in Japan
Nichiren Buddhism
Jōdo-shū
Buddhism in the Azuchi–Momoyama period